Émile Mireaux (21 August 1885 – 27 December 1969) was a French economist, journalist, politician and literary historian.
In the 1930s he edited Le Temps and contributed to other right-leaning journals.
He became a senator in 1936, and briefly served as a minister in 1940.
From 1940 until his death he held a chair in political economy, statistics and finance at the Académie des Sciences Morales et Politiques.

Early years

Émile Mireaux was born in Mont-de-Marsan, Landes, on 21 August 1885.
His father was of Pyrenean origin, was an ordnance officer under General Georges Ernest Boulanger and was serving in the Mont-de-Marsan garrison.
His father died when Émile was three years old.
After this Émile lived as a boarder at Tarbes and then as an officer's son at the Prytanée National Militaire in La Flèche, where he developed a love of rugby football.

Mireaux was a brilliant secondary school student.
He entered the École Normale Supérieure in 1906, and graduated in History and Geography in 1910.
He taught at high schools in Alençon and Orléans, and at the Institut Français in Madrid in 1913–14.
During World War I (1914–18) he was mobilized as an infantry officer in August 1914 and served until March 1919.
He was wounded twice, cited three times and made a knight of the Legion of Honour.

1920s

Mireaux was a professor at the preparation center for the grandes écoles in 1919 and 1920, then prepared students for their agrégation at the École Normale Supérieure from 1920 to 1922.
For obscure reasons he left the university and went to work for the Société d'études et d'informations économiques (Society for Economic Studies and Information) chaired by Jacques Bardoux.
This had been created in 1922 to study economic evolution after the First World War.
He was first editor-in-chief of the studies section, then in 1924 took over as managing director in place of André François-Poncet.
It was here that he became familiar with economics.
Mireaux was economics editor for Le Temps from 1928 to 1931.
He was a member of the Redressement Français movement led by Ernest Mercier, and asserted that he was an ardent supporter of economic liberalism.

1930s

Mireaux was a member of the Société d'économie politique in Paris.
He served as its secretary-general from 1930 to 1937, then president from 1937 to 1940.
He belonged to the young school that helped adapt the old orthodox doctrines to the modern economy.
He was co-editor of Le Temps from 1 January 1932 to November 1942.
Le Temps, which first appeared on 25 April 1861, was a major moderate and liberal newspaper.
After World War I (1914–18) it moved towards the right and aligned with the major French employers.
In 1924 the paper opposed the Cartel des Gauches.
Émile Mireaux and Jacques Chastenet were put in charge of the paper in 1931.
Their diplomatic positions evolved to match those of Great Britain.

Mireaux became a municipal councilor in Bazordan, Hautes-Pyrénées.
He competed in the Hautes-Pyrénées senatorial election on 20 October 1935, and was elected on the second ballot.
He joined the Democratic and Radical Union in the Senate.
He sat in committees on the army, hygiene and social welfare, foreign affairs and education.

World War II (1939–45)

On 18 May 1940 Mireaux was elected to the  political economy, statistics and finance chair  in the Académie des Sciences Morales et Politiques, which had been vacated by the death of Clément Colson.
On 10 July 1940 at the Vichy Congress he voted for granting full constitutional powers to Marshal Philippe Pétain.
Mireau replaced Albert Rivaud, Minister of National Education, on 12 July 1940, taking the title of Minister of Public Instruction and Fine Arts.
Mireaux concentrated all decision-making in his hands by abolishing the university advisory councils and suspending university elections.
This gave him freedom to appoint or dismiss academics at will.
On 6 September 1940 he was replaced by Georges Ripert, who was named Secretary of State for Public Instruction and Youth.

After the defeat of France the distribution  of Le Temps was restricted to the zone libre.
Mireaux and Chastenet decided to suspend publication on 29 November 1942 following the German invasion of the zone libre.
From 1942 to 1945 Mireaux lived quietly.

Later career

Mireaux was tried by the High Court during the process of political cleansing of parliamentarians who voted the constitutional bill on 10 July 1940.
On 23 January 1947 he obtained a judgement dismissing the charges due to his involvement in resistance.
After this he withdrew from political life.
Mireaux was president of the Académie des Sciences Morales et Politiques for 1951 and president of the Institut de France for 1951.
Émile Mireaux died in Paris on 27 December 1969.

Publications

Émile Mireaux contributed to many French and foreign reviews, including the Revue des deux Mondes, Revue de Paris, Revue Hebdomadaire, Revue politique et parlementaire and the Encyclopédie française and Encyclopædia Britannica.
Émile Mireaux was the author of:

Mireaux wrote prefaces to:

Notes

Citations

Sources

1885 births
1969 deaths
French economists
Members of the Académie des sciences morales et politiques
Senators of Hautes-Pyrénées
20th-century French journalists